Switched on Pop: How Popular Music Works, and Why it Matters is a 2019 nonfiction book written by Charlie Harding and Nate Sloan with illustrations provided by Iris Gottlieb. The book covers pop music from a musicological perspective. The book is a literary component to the podcast Switched on Pop which is co-hosted by Harding and Sloan and similarly analyzes pop music in a more academic style.  The title of both the book and podcast is a play on the debut album by the American composer Wendy Carlos Switched-On Bach.

Background
Nate Sloan is a musicology professor at the Thornton School of Music of the University of Southern California. Charlie Harding is a songwriter and a music producer. Harding and Sloan started their podcast in October 2014. In the podcast, which is released by Vox Media, the duo discuss and analyze the musical concepts behind popular music. In an interview with The Wall Street Journal, Harding and Sloan revealed they decided to write the book because "the book allows us to think about the things we’ve learned and put them in historical context" and because listeners wanted a "comprehensive guide to how to listen more thoughtfully."

Overview
The book contains 16 chapters. Each chapter focuses on a pop song from the previous twenty years and uses it to explain a specific musical concept. For example, "Oops!... I Did It Again" by Britney Spears is used to explain counterpoint and "Paper Planes" by M.I.A. is used to highlight the historical and legal aspects of sampling. "Call Me Maybe" by Carly Rae Jepsen and "Get Enough" by Paul McCartney are also analyzed in the introduction and conclusion, respectively, without an associated musical concept.

Reception
Switched on Pop received positive reviews from critics. Hannah Giorgis of The Atlantic praised the book, writing "Switched on Pop is a far less foreboding sensory experience than 'Swimming Pools,' but it’s no less immersive." Emily Bootle of the New Statesman noted that the "required understanding of music theory leads to necessarily laborious explanations, but also allows for the authors' most illuminating insights". Neil Shah of The Wall Street Journal lauded the book for its "sophisticated but accessible discussion" of the selected musical tracks.

See also 

 Music podcast

References

External links

2019 non-fiction books
Books about pop music
Oxford University Press books
Audio podcasts
Music podcasts
Works based on podcasts